A case presentation is a formal communication between health care professionals such as doctors and nurses regarding a patient's clinical information.

Essential parts of a case presentation include:
 Identification
 Reason for consultation/admission
 Chief complaints (CC) - what made patients seek medical attention.
 History of present illness (HPI) - circumstances relating to chief complaints.
 Past medical history (PMHx)
 Past surgical history
 Current medications
 Allergies
 Family history (FHx)
 Social history (SocHx)
 Physical examination (PE)
 Laboratory results (Lab)
 Other investigations (imaging, biopsy etc.)
 Case summary and impression
 Management plans
 follow up in clinic or hospital
 Adherence of the patient to treatment
 success of the treatment or failure.
 causes of success or failure.

References

Medical terminology